Cheneya rovena is a moth in the Bombycidae family. It was described by Schaus in 1929.

References

Natural History Museum Lepidoptera generic names catalog

Bombycidae
Moths described in 1929